William Tyndale (c. 1494 – 1536) was a 16th-century Protestant reformer and Bible translator.

Tynedale, was a local government district in south-west Northumberland, England between 1974 and 2009.

Tyndale or Tynedale may also refer to:

People with the surname
 George Tyndale (1913-1991), Jamaican musician
 Hector Tyndale (1821–1880), United States military officer, brother of Sharon, descendant of William
 John Tyndale (died 1413), English politician
 Mark Tyndale (born 1986), American basketball player
 Mary Tindale (1920–2011), Australian botanist 
 Orville Sievwright Tyndale (1887–1952), Canadian judge
 Robert Tyndale (fl. 1417-1419), English politician
 Sharon Tyndale (1816–1871), American politician
 Thomas Tyndale (1528/33–1571), English politician
 Walter Tyndale (1855-1943), English painter
 William Tyndale (c. 1494 – 1536) was a 16th-century Protestant reformer and Bible translator.

Religion
 Tyndale Baptist Church, church in Bristol, England
 Tyndale Bible, Bible translated by William Tyndale
 Tyndale House, Christian publishing company

Educational institutions 
 Tyndale Academy, a defunct school in London, England
 Tyndale Christian School (disambiguation), several schools
 Tyndale House (Cambridge), a biblical studies centre in Cambridge, England
 Tyndale Theological Seminary, Christian seminary and Bible institute in Fort Worth, Texas
 Tyndale Theological Seminary (Europe), a Christian seminary in the Netherlands
 Tyndale University College and Seminary, school in Toronto, Ontario
 William Tyndale College, a Christian college in Michigan
 William Tyndale Junior School, in Islington, London, England

See also 
 Tindal (disambiguation) for Tindal, Tindale and Tindall
 Tyndall (disambiguation)

English-language surnames